Prior to its uniform adoption of proportional representation in 1999, the United Kingdom used first-past-the-post for the European elections in England, Scotland and Wales. The European Parliament constituencies used under that system were smaller than the later regional constituencies and only had one Member of the European Parliament each.

The constituency of Surrey was one of them.

When it was created in England in 1979, it consisted of the Westminster Parliament constituencies of Chertsey and Walton, Dorking, Epsom and Ewell, Esher, Guildford, Reigate, Surrey North West, and Woking.

It was split in 1984, with the eastern half merging with London South as London South and Surrey East and the rest becoming Surrey West.

The constituency was re-created in 1994, consisting of the Westminster Parliament constituencies of Chertsey and Walton, Esher, Guildford, Mole Valley, North West Surrey, Reigate, and Woking.

MEPs

Election results

References

External links
 David Boothroyd's United Kingdom Election Results

European Parliament constituencies in England (1979–1999)
Politics of Surrey
1979 establishments in England
1984 disestablishments in England
Constituencies established in 1979
Constituencies disestablished in 1984
1994 establishments in England
1999 disestablishments in England
Constituencies established in 1994
Constituencies disestablished in 1999